Nannamoria is a small taxonomic genus of small-sized sea snails, predatory marine gastropod molluscs in the subfamily Amoriinae of the family Volutidae, the volutes.

Distribution
Nannamoria volutes are endemic to Australia. They are found on the east and southern coast, in deep water on the outer continental shelf.

Shell description
The shells of Nannamoria have a small blunt protoconch, their overall shape varies but most species have a shoulder with nodules or spines. The base colour of the shells of Nannamoria is white, and they are overlaid with brown axial lines.

Biology
These volutes live in very deep water and little is known about their live appearance or their biology.

Species
The genus Nannamoria includes the following species:

 Nannamoria amicula Iredale, 1929
 Nannamoria breviforma Bail & Limpus, 2008
 Nannamoria bulbosa Bail & Limpus, 2008
 Nannamoria gotoi Poppe, 1992
 Nannamoria inflata Bail & Limpus, 2008
 Nannamoria inopinata Darragh, 1979
 Nannamoria parabola Garrard, 1960
 Nannamoria ranya Willan, 1995

References

 Bail, P.; Poppe, G.T. (2001). A conchological iconography: a taxonomic introduction of the recent Volutidae. ConchBooks, Hackenheim. 30 pp, 5 pl.

Volutidae